The 2006–07 Polish Cup was the fifty-third season of the annual Polish cup competition. It began on 5 August 2006 with the Extra Preliminary Round and ended on 1 May 2007 with the Final, played at Stadion GKS, Bełchatów. The winners qualified for the first qualifying round of the UEFA Cup. Wisła Płock were the defending champions.

Extra Preliminary Round 
The matches took place on 5 and 9 August 2006.

! colspan="3" style="background:cornsilk;"|5 August 2006

|-
! colspan="3" style="background:cornsilk;"|9 August 2006

|}

Preliminary round 
The matches took place on 15 August 2006.

! colspan="3" style="background:cornsilk;"|15 August 2006

|-
! colspan="3" style="background:cornsilk;"|No match

|}

Notes
Note 1: Kaszubia Kościerzyna withdrew from the competition.

Round 1 
The matches took place on 22 and 23 August 2006.

! colspan="3" style="background:cornsilk;"|22 August 2006

|-
! colspan="3" style="background:cornsilk;"|23 August 2006

|-
! colspan="3" style="background:cornsilk;"|No match

|}

Notes
Note 1: Heko Czermno withdrew from the competition.

Round 2 
The matches took place on 19, 20, 26 September and 4 October 2006.

! colspan="3" style="background:cornsilk;"|19 September 2006

|-
! colspan="3" style="background:cornsilk;"|20 September 2006

|-
! colspan="3" style="background:cornsilk;"|26 September 2006

|-
! colspan="3" style="background:cornsilk;"|4 October 2006

|-
! colspan="3" style="background:cornsilk;"|No match
|-
|style="text-align:right; background:#d0f0c0;"| Jagiellonia Białystok 
|style="text-align:center; " colspan=2 rowspan=1|bye to the next round
|}

Round 3 
The matches took place on 24 October, 7 and 8 November 2006.

! colspan="3" style="background:cornsilk;"|24 October 2006

|-
! colspan="3" style="background:cornsilk;"|7 November 2006

|-
! colspan="3" style="background:cornsilk;"|8 November 2006

|}

Quarter-finals 
The first legs took place on 13 and 14 March, when the second legs took place on 3 and 4 April 2007.

|}

Notes
Note 1: Arka Gdynia was excluded from the competition for being involved in a corruption affair.

Semi-finals 
The first legs took place on 10 and 11 April, when the second legs took place on 24 and 25 April 2007.

|}

Final

References

External links 
 90minut.pl 

Polish Cup seasons
Polish Cup
Cup